Glen Bortell (September 9, 1914 – April 18, 2015) was an American politician who served in the Iowa Senate from the 12th district from 1969 to 1971 and in the Iowa House of Representatives from the 58th district from 1973 to 1977.

He died on April 18, 2015, in Inverness, Florida at age 100.

References

1914 births
2015 deaths
Republican Party Iowa state senators
Republican Party members of the Iowa House of Representatives